Zieria compacta  is a plant in the citrus family Rutaceae and is endemic to eastern Australia. It is an erect, bushy shrub with leaves composed of three leaflets, and white flowers with four petals and four stamens. It usually grows in rocky places on steep hills.

Description
The branches are smooth and lack obvious glands but are covered with a dense layer of hairs, especially when young. The upper surface of the leaves is glabrous and dark green while the lower surface is a paler green, covered with a thin, dense layer of hairs and has an obvious mid-vein.

The flowers are white to pale pink and are arranged in groups of mostly six flowers (but sometimes as few as one or as many as 35) in leaf axils. The groups are usually about as long as the leaves. Flowering occurs in spring and is followed by fruit which is a glabrous follicle composed of up to four sections joined at the base and which burst open to release their seeds when ripe.

Taxonomy and naming
Zieria compacta was first formally described in 1942 by Cyril Tenison White in Proceedings of the Royal Society of Queensland from a specimen collected near Stanthorpe. The specific epithet (compacta) is a Latin word meaning "thick" or "firm".

Distribution and habitat
This zieria mainly occurs south from the Darling Downs and Fraser Island in Queensland to the far south coast of New South Wales. It usually grows on steep rocky hillsides in poor soils near granite or sandstone.

References

compacta
Sapindales of Australia
Flora of New South Wales
Flora of Queensland
Plants described in 1942